Matthew Knox (born 22 December 1999) is a Scottish footballer who plays as a striker for Musselburgh Athletic. He has previously played for Livingston, East Fife, Berwick Rangers and Brechin City.

Career
Knox grew up in Prestonpans, East Lothian. He became the youngest player in Livingston's history when he made his first-team debut against St Mirren on Boxing Day, just four days after his 16th birthday. Knox made his first starting appearance for Livingston on 26 April 2016, during which he set up the only goal in a 1–0 win against Rangers.

Knox was loaned to East Fife in January 2018, and Berwick Rangers in January 2019.

During his time at Livingston, Knox went on trial at Rangers in 2016 and also had trials in England with Manchester United, Liverpool and Sunderland.

On 11 July 2019, Knox signed for Scottish League Two club Brechin City.

He played for Tranent Juniors F.C. during the 2021-22 season.

Knox signed for Musselburgh Athletic in 2022.

Personal life
Knox has a younger brother called Daniel and an older brother called Jay.

Career statistics

References

External links

1999 births
Living people
Scottish footballers
Association football forwards
Livingston F.C. players
Scottish Professional Football League players
Footballers from Edinburgh
East Fife F.C. players
Berwick Rangers F.C. players
Brechin City F.C. players
Warrenpoint Town F.C. players
Tranent Juniors F.C. players
Musselburgh Athletic F.C. players